Choudhry Bilal Ahmed Virk (born 1 January 1974) is a Pakistani politician who had been a member of the National Assembly of Pakistan, from 2002 to May 2018.

Early life
He was born on 1 January 1974 in Pakistan.

Political career

He was elected to the National Assembly of Pakistan as a candidate of Pakistan Muslim League (Q) (PML-Q) from Constituency NA-136 (Sheikhupura-VI) in 2002 Pakistani general election. He received 63,617 votes and defeated Syed Muhammad Akbar Shah, a candidate of Pakistan Peoples Party (PPP).

He was re-elected to the National Assembly as a candidate of Pakistan Muslim League (N) (PML-N) from Constituency NA-136 (Nankana Sahib-cum-Sheikhupura) in 2008 Pakistani general election. He received 49,681 votes and defeated Peer Tariq Ahmed Shah, a candidate of PML-Q.

He was re-elected to the National Assembly as a candidate of PML-N from Constituency NA-136 (Nankana Sahib-II Cum-Sheikhupura) in 2013 Pakistani general election. He received 73,775 votes and defeated Shahid Manzoor Gill, a candidate of PML-Q.

In April 2018, he quit PML-N and joined Pakistan Tehreek-e-Insaf.

References

Living people
Punjabi people
Pakistani MNAs 2013–2018
1974 births
Pakistani MNAs 2002–2007
Pakistani MNAs 2008–2013